Lily Walker (born 5 June 2002) is an English field hockey player who plays for the England and Great Britain national teams.

She won a Commonwealth gold medal at Birmingham in August 2022 with the England hockey team.   It was the first time in history that England had won the Commonwealth gold.

References

External links
 

Living people
2002 births
English female field hockey players
University of Birmingham Hockey Club players
Female field hockey forwards
Commonwealth Games gold medallists for England
Commonwealth Games medallists in field hockey
Field hockey players at the 2022 Commonwealth Games
Medallists at the 2022 Commonwealth Games